Maricopa High School is a high school in Maricopa, Arizona under the jurisdiction of the Maricopa Unified School District.

Maricopa High School was opened in 1955 with the first freshman class on 35 students, and for the next decade, it held fewer than 100 students. The school's first graduating class was the class of 1959. At the height of the Baby Boom era, Maricopa peaked in 1976 with 218 students. It next surpassed that in 1985, when the school had 221 students. At the end of 1999, the school had some 306 students.

The 2000s were a decade of stunning growth in Pinal County (which saw 109% growth) and especially Maricopa (which grew 4,180%). In 2000, Maricopa had 308 students. That jumped quickly (within five years) to 551, then to 1190 by October 2007, 1473 in October 2008, and 1612 in October 2010. Maricopa High School is now larger than the town of Maricopa was in the year 2000 (1,040 residents).

References

Educational institutions established in 1959
Public high schools in Arizona
Schools in Pinal County, Arizona
Maricopa, Arizona
1959 establishments in Arizona